Ecuador at the 1968 Summer Olympics in Mexico City, Mexico was the nation's first appearance under the auspices of the Ecuadorian National Olympic Committee following a 44 year hiatus from the 1924 Summer Olympics. A national team of fifteen athletes (fourteen men and one woman) competed in twenty-one events in six sports.

Athletics

 Gustavo Gutierrez

Boxing

 Rafael Anchundia
 Samuel Valencia

Cycling

Four cyclists represented Ecuador in 1968.

Individual road race
 Noé Medina
 Victor Morales
 Arnulfo Pozo
 Hipólito Pozo

Team time trial
 Arnulfo Pozo
 Hipólito Pozo
 Noé Medina
 Victor Morales

Gymnastics

 Sergio Luna
 Eduardo Najera
 Pedro Rendón

Swimming

 Fernando González
 Eduardo Orejuela
 Tamara Orejuela

Wrestling

 César Solari
 Marco Terán

Tennis

Demonstration sport
 Ana María Icaza
 María Elena Guzmán
 Francisca Guzmán
 Miguel Olvera

References

External links
Ecuador Olympic Committee
Official Olympic Reports

Nations at the 1968 Summer Olympics
1968
Olymp